Mei Foo North, formerly called Ching Lai, is one of the 25 constituencies in the Sham Shui Po District. The constituency returns one district councillor to the Sham Shui Po District Council, with an election every four years.

Mei Foo North constituency is loosely based on the northern side of the Mei Foo Sun Chuen in Lai Chi Kok with estimated population of 15,847.

Councillors represented

Ching Lai (1994–2003)

Mei Foo North (2003 to present)

Election results

2010s

2000s

1990s

References

Lai Chi Kok
Constituencies of Hong Kong
Constituencies of Sham Shui Po District Council
2003 establishments in Hong Kong
Constituencies established in 2003
1994 establishments in Hong Kong
Constituencies established in 1994